Sir Michael Pepper  (born 10 August 1942) is a British physicist notable for his work in semiconductor nanostructures.

Early life
Pepper was born on 10 August 1942 to Morris and Ruby Pepper. He was educated at St Marylebone Grammar School, a grammar school in the City of Westminster, London that has since closed. He then went on to study physics at the University of Reading and graduated Bachelor of Science (BSc) in 1963. He remained at Reading to undertake postgraduate studies and completed his Doctor of Philosophy (PhD) degree in 1967.

In 1987, while an academic of the University of Cambridge, he was granted the status of Master of Arts (MA Cantab). He was awarded a higher doctorate, Doctor of Science (ScD), by Cambridge.

Career
Sir Michael was a physicist at the Plessey Research Laboratories when he formed a collaboration with Sir Nevill Mott, (Nobel Laureate, 1977) which resulted in his commencing research in the Cavendish Laboratory in 1973 on localisation in semiconductor structures. He subsequently joined the GEC Hirst Research Centre where he set up joint Cambridge-GEC projects. He was one of three authors on the paper that eventually brought a Nobel prize for the quantum Hall effect to Klaus von Klitzing. Sir Michael formed the Semiconductor Physics research group at the Cavendish Laboratory in 1984, and following a period as Royal Society Warren Research Fellow was appointed to his current role, Professorship of Physics, at the Cavendish Laboratory in 1987. In 1991, he was appointed managing director of the newly established Toshiba Cambridge Research Centre, now known as the Cambridge Research Laboratory (CRL) of Toshiba Research Europe. The following year, 2001, he was appointed Scientific Director of TeraView, a company formed by spinning off the terahertz research arm of CRL. He became an honorary Professor of Pharmaceutical Science in the University of Otago, New Zealand in 2003. He left his Cambridge Chair to take up the Pender Chair of Nanoelectronics at University College London in 2009 and has been associated with many developments in Semiconductor Physics and applications of terahertz radiation. He sits on the Scientific Advisory Committee of Australia's ARC Centre of Excellence in Future Low-Energy Electronics Technologies.

Honors
He was elected a Fellow of the Royal Society in 1983 and was elected a Fellow of Trinity College, Cambridge, in 1982. In 1987 he received the Hughes Medal. Previously he had received the Europhysics Prize of the European Physical Society, and the Guthrie Prize of the Institute of Physics both in 1985. The Institute of Physics awarded Sir Michael the first Mott Prize in 2000. He had previously given the first Mott Lecture in 1985. He was awarded the Royal Medal in 2005 for his "work which has had the highest level of influence in condensed matter physics and has resulted in the creation of the modern field of semiconductor nanostructures," gave the Royal Society's Bakerian Prize Lecture in 2004 and received a knighthood in the 2006 New Year's Honours list for services to physics. He was appointed a fellow of the Royal Academy of Engineering. In 2010 he won the Swan Medal and Prize. He has been awarded the 2013 Faraday Medal of the IET. In 2019 he was awarded the Institute of Physics Isaac Newton Medal.

Research interests

 Current and resistance quantisation phenomena
 Measurement of electron charge
 One-dimensional and zero-dimensional electronic phenomena
 Quantum transport in general
 Localisation and metal-insulator transitions
 Properties of strongly interacting electron gases
 Bose–Einstein condensation in the solid state
 Hybrid magnetic-semiconductor structures
 Medical physics, Physics in medicine and biology

Media appearances
 Horizon: What is One Degree (10 January 2011) – Interviewed by his former PhD student Ben Miller.

See also
 Quantum Hall effect

References

External links
  Summary of Pepper's Work from Toshiba
 Homepage at the Semiconductor Physics Research group
 Pepper's publication list
 Toshiba Research Europe
 Pepper's Hughes Medal citation
  Pepper biography

1942 births
Living people
British Jews
Jewish scientists
Fellows of the Royal Society
People educated at St Marylebone Grammar School
Alumni of the University of Reading
Fellows of Trinity College, Cambridge
Knights Bachelor
Royal Medal winners
English electrical engineers
Academics of University College London
General Electric Company
Fellows of the American Physical Society